State Road 73 (NM 73) is a state highway in the US state of New Mexico. NM 73's northern terminus is at NM 75 in Peñasco, and the southern terminus is at an intersection with Lower Llano Rd. / Piaza Rd. in Llano.

Major intersections

See also

References

073
Transportation in Taos County, New Mexico